John Campbell (September 11, 1765 – June 23, 1828) was a United States representative from Maryland. Born near Port Tobacco, he studied law and was admitted to the bar and practiced. He held several local offices and was a member of the Maryland State Senate for three years.

Campbell was elected as a Federalist to the Seventh and to the four succeeding Congresses, serving from March 4, 1801, to March 3, 1811. He was judge of the orphans’ court of Charles County. He died at "Charleston" farm, in Charles County; interment was in the private burying ground on the estate of Daniel Jenifer.

References

1765 births
1828 deaths
Maryland state court judges
People from Charles County, Maryland
Maryland state senators
Federalist Party members of the United States House of Representatives from Maryland